Conaty Park is a baseball venue in Smithfield, Rhode Island, United States.  It is home to the Bryant Bulldogs baseball team of the NCAA Division I Northeast Conference.  The facility was opened in 2000 and has a capacity of 500 spectators.  It features an electronic scoreboard, bullpens, and dugouts.  In 2008, batting cages were added adjacent to the field.  Also, the infield has recently been renovated.

Formerly known as the Bryant Baseball Complex, the facility was rededicated as Conaty Park on April 28, 2012, prior to a game against Fairleigh Dickinson.  It is named for Bryant alumnus Bill Conaty.  Conaty is a published author and former business executive.

In 2004, the facility hosted the NCAA Division II Baseball Northeast Regional, which Bryant won.

See also 
 List of NCAA Division I baseball venues

References

External links 
 Video of April 2012 dedication ceremony at Youtube.com
 Photo gallery at StadiumJourney.com

College baseball venues in the United States
Baseball venues in Rhode Island
Bryant Bulldogs baseball
2000 establishments in Rhode Island
Sports venues completed in 2000